The 1907 Louisiana Industrial football team was an American football team that represented the Louisiana Industrial Institute—now known as Louisiana Tech University—as an independent during the 1907 college football season. In their first and only season under head coach George L. Watkins, Louisiana Industrial compiled a record of 9–1. The team's captain was Dave Caldwell.

Schedule

References

Louisiana Industrial
Louisiana Tech Bulldogs football seasons
Louisiana Industrial football